Torres Obispado, Spanish for Bishopric Towers or Diocese Towers, is a skyscraper complex in Monterrey, Mexico, which consists of a 305.3 m mixed-use supertall skyscraper called T.Op Torre 1 and a 156 m residential skyscraper called T.Op Torre 2. Upon completion, T.Op Torre 1 became the tallest skyscraper in Latin America and the 25th tallest skyscraper in North America.

Description

T.Op Torre 1 

T.Op Torre 1 is mixed use and houses a Hilton Garden Inn, restaurants, office space, and residences.

T.Op Torre 2 

T.Op Torre 2 is primarily residential.

See also
List of tallest buildings in Mexico
List of tallest buildings in North America
List of tallest buildings in Latin America
List of supertall skyscrapers

References

Office buildings completed in 2020
Buildings and structures in Monterrey